The Crimean Mountain karst is a karst and regional nature reserve (zakaznik) in Crimea, a region internationally recognised as part of Ukraine but currently under occupation by Russia since 2014. It is a part of the larger Qarabiy yayla mountain range, making up the central part of the range. The area was first described by Alexander Kruber in 1915. In 1989 the Crimean Mountain karst was recognised as a regional nature reserve.

Description 
In 1915 Alexander Kruber first described the karst of the mountains. The Crimean Mountain karst was declared a nature reserve in 1989. Additionally, the top of the karst is home to beech and pine forests, as well as meadows and areas dominated by Cerastium biebersteinii. The area has more than 1000 natural karst cavities. Minerals found in the cavities include: calcite, gypsum, goethite, aragonite, illite, quartz, kaolinite and pyrolusite.

Status 
The Crimean Mountain karst was recognised as a regional nature preserve by the Ukrainian SSR on 13 February 1989, alongside several other areas throughout Ukraine. This designation remained in place following the Declaration of Independence of Ukraine.

Since the annexation of Crimea by the Russian Federation, the Crimean Mountain karst has been recognised as a State Geographical Nature Reserve of Regional Importance, equivalent to the Ukrainian title of regional nature reserve.

References 

Crimean Mountains
Karst formations
Landforms of Crimea